Iris Tjonk (born 13 April 2000 in Almelo) is a Dutch swimmer. She won the silver medal in the 100m backstroke at the Swimming at the 2013 European Youth Summer Olympic Festival. At the 2015 European Games in Baku, Azerbaijan, she won the silver medal in the 4 × 100 metre medley relay event.

See also
 Netherlands at the 2015 European Games

References

2000 births
Living people
Dutch female backstroke swimmers
Sportspeople from Almelo
European Games medalists in swimming
European Games silver medalists for the Netherlands
Swimmers at the 2015 European Games
21st-century Dutch women